Reckless Abandon may refer to:

In music:
 Reckless Abandon (David Bromberg album), 1977
 Reckless Abandon (Andrew F album), 2008
 "Reckless Abandon", a song by Blink-182 from Take Off Your Pants and Jacket
 "Reckless Abandon", a song by It Dies Today from Lividity

In other media:
 "Reckless Abandon" (Charmed), an episode of Charmed
 Reckless Abandon, a 2004 novel by Stuart Woods
 Reckless Abandon, a book by Larry Tomczak

In sports:
 Reckless Abandon (horse) (foaled 2010), a British Thoroughbred racehorse
 Reckless Abandon, a 2007 HDNet Fights MMA event